Kristine Edner Wæhler (born 8 November 1976 in Røa) is a retired Norwegian footballer who played as a midfielder for the Norway women's national football team. She was part of the team at the 2003 FIFA Women's World Cup. On club level she played for Røa IL in Norway.

Honors and awards
 with Røa
 Toppserien Champions: 2004, 2007, 2008, 2009
 Norwegian Women's Cup: 2004, 2006, 2008, 2009

Personal life
She is married to footballer Thomas Wæhler.

References

External links
 
 

1976 births
Living people
Footballers from Oslo
Norwegian women's footballers
Norway women's international footballers
2003 FIFA Women's World Cup players
Women's association football midfielders
Røa IL players
Place of birth missing (living people)